Henryk Górecki: String Quartets Nos. 1 and 2 is a studio album by the Kronos Quartet, with two compositions by Polish composer Henryk Górecki. The Kronos Quartet had recorded "Already It Is Dusk", his first string quartet, in 1990 and released it on Henryk Mikolaj Górecki: Already It Is Dusk/"Lerchenmusik". The Kronos Quartet recorded and released all three of Górecki's string quartets, the third and last in 2007, on Henryk Górecki: String Quartet No. 3 ('...songs are sung').

Track listing

Critical reception
Michael Walsh, writing for Time, called Górecki "an uncompromising modernist who just may be the Bruckner of our day," and the performance of the string quartets by the "inestimable Kronos Quartet . . . excellent."

Credits

Musicians
David Harrington – violin
John Sherba – violin
Hank Dutt – viola
Joan Jeanrenaud – cello

Production
Track 1 recorded July 1990 at Skywalker Sound, Nicasio, California
Bob Edwards, Judith Sherman – engineers
Tracks 2–5 recorded August 1992 at Skywalker Sound
Bob Edwards, Judith Sherman – engineers
Craig Silvey – assistant engineer

See also
List of 1993 albums

References

Kronos Quartet albums
1993 classical albums
Compositions by Henryk Górecki
Nonesuch Records albums